Yury Dubinin is a former international speedway rider from the Soviet Union.

Speedway career 
Dubinin was the Champion of the Soviet Union in 1969. He also won a bronze medal at the Speedway World Team Cup in the 1969 Speedway World Team Cup. Dubinin was twice a Soviet junior champion.

World final appearances

World Team Cup
 1969 -  Rybnik, Rybnik Municipal Stadium (with Viktor Trofimov / Vladimir Smirnov / Gennady Kurilenko / Valeri Klementiev) - 3rd - 23pts (1)

Individual Ice Speedway World Championship
1970 -  Nässjö, 6th - 9pts
1972 –  Nässjö, 10th – 6pts

Family
His brother Vyacheslav Dubinin won the silver medal at the 1967 Individual Ice Speedway World Championship and both of Yury's sons Igor and Vladimir were speedway riders.

References 

Russian speedway riders
Possibly living people
Year of birth missing